was a town located in the Kanzaki District of Saga Prefecture, on the island of Kyūshū, Japan. The status of this municipality was changed from a village to a town on April 1, 1965.

As of 2003, the town had an estimated population of 11,924 and a population density of 481.39 persons per km2. The total area is 24.77 km2.

On March 20, 2006, Chiyoda, along with the town of Kanzaki (former), and the village of Sefuri (all from Kanzaki District), was merged to create the city of Kanzaki.

Dissolved municipalities of Saga Prefecture